Víctor Hugo Peña Grisales (born July 10, 1974 in Bogotá) is a Colombian professional retired road racing cyclist. He last rode for the  professional cycling team. In 2003, Peña became the first Colombian to wear the yellow jersey at the Tour de France. He held the yellow jersey for three days following the 4th, 5th and 6th stages of that year's tour.

Peña's 2003 Tour de France, where he served as domestique for Lance Armstrong, is described in detail in Matt Rendell's book A Significant Other. The book also describes the rider's amateur and early professional career.

He is named after both his father Hugo and the author Victor Hugo. He earned his nickname "El Tiburon" ("the shark") due to his looks and the other sport he excelled at besides cycling – swimming. Peña finished 7th in the 100 meter freestyle Pan American swimming championships for juniors in 1991.

At the end of the season in 2012, Peña retired. Later, Pena was implicated in the 2012 USADA Reasoned Report into doping on the US Postal team and was concluded to worked with Dr. Michele Ferrari and received blood transfusions during his Tour de France participations.

Results and teams

 1998 – Telecom-Kelme
 1st  Mountains Competition – Midre Libre
 1st  Mountains Competition – Vuelta a Castilla y Leon
 8th Overall Vuelta a Colombia
 Prologue & Stage 6 
 1st  Points Classification 
 10th Overall Volta a Catalunya

 2000 – Vitalicio Seguros
 15th Overall Giro d'Italia
 Stage 11 (ITT)

2001 – US Postal

 2002 – US Postal
 1st  Overall Vuelta a Murcia
 3rd Overall Ronde van Nederland
 Stage 4 (ITT)

 2003 – US Postal
 Stage 4 TTT Tour de France 
 Held  Jersey for 3 Days
 2nd Overall Volta ao Algarve
 6th Overall Vuelta a Murcia
 Stage 4 
 10th Overall Ronde van Nederland

 2004 – US Postal
 Stage 1 (TTT) Vuelta a España
 2nd Overall Volta ao Algarve
 4th Overall Tour of Belgium

 2005 – Phonak
 10th ITT World Cycling Championships

 2006 – Phonak
 9th Overall – Giro d'Italia

 2007 – Unibet
 1st  Sprint Classification, Volta a Catalunya

 2008 – Café de Colombia-Colombia es Pasión
 1st stage 7 Vuelta a Colombia

 2009 – Café de Colombia-Colombia es Pasión
 15th Overall Vuelta a Colombia
 Stage 12

References

External links

1974 births
Living people
Colombian male cyclists
Cyclists at the 1999 Pan American Games
Cyclists at the 2000 Summer Olympics
Cyclists at the 2004 Summer Olympics
Olympic cyclists of Colombia
Sportspeople from Bogotá
Colombian Giro d'Italia stage winners
Vuelta a Colombia stage winners
Pan American Games competitors for Colombia